The A1 is an eight-storey building that is located at SW1 on the South Bank of the Brisbane River in Brisbane, Queensland, Australia. The building was designed by Allen Jack+Cottier architects, in association with Cox Rayner, and the building comprises ground floor housing retail and services and seven storeys above being used as commercial spaces. SW1 consist of six residential buildings and four commercial towers with retail nodes.

Design

Landscape architects Gamble McKinnon Green designed the ground floor atmosphere to resemble the surroundings of a rainforest oasis. Fern trees have been planted along the pedestrian pathways and green vines climbs the wall of the A1. According to the architects, the ground plane is crucial as it has to attract people to walk through the space. A long pedestrian spine divides the buildings and allows the sun to penetrate at the urban square which is also along the thoroughfare. The pedestrian spine aims to connect the sense of open space in between the buildings and so that the surrounding buildings will not give a sense like the block is a block by itself but rather an open space block.

Sustainability
Like other buildings located at the SW1, the A1 is given a 5stars rating for its energy efficiency under the Australian Building Greenhouse Rating (ABGR) scheme. The precast concrete sunblades and extended eaves reduce solar access that penetrates through the window. Rainwater collected from the roof will be recycled for toilet flushing and irrigation.

Gallery

References 

 Allen Jack + Cottier newsletter 
 Ancr CEO interview
 Austcorp
 Australian Institute of Architects
 Cox Architecture

External links 
 Cox Architecture

Buildings and structures in Brisbane